Mitja Velikonja (born 1965) is a Slovenian cultural studies academic and professor at the University of Ljubljana where he is head of the Center for Cultural and Religious Studies.

His book Post-Socialist Political Graffiti in the Balkans and Central Europe received the prize for one of the highest annual accomplishments of the University of Ljubljana in 2020. His other books include "Masade duha" (Znanstveno in publicistično središče, Ljubljana, 2006), "Bosanski religijski mozaiki" (Znanstveno in publicistično središče, Ljubljana, 1998), "Mitografije sedanjosti" (Študentska založba, Ljubljana, 2003), "Religious Separation and Political Intolerance in Bosnia-Herzegovina" (Texas A&M University Press, 2003) and "Evroza. Kritika novega evrocentrizma" (Mirovni inštitut, Ljubljana, 2005).

Velikonja was a visiting professor at multiple institutions which include Jagiellonian University (2002–2003), Columbia University (2009–2014), University of Rijeka (2015), New York Institute in Sanint Petersburg (2015–2016), Yale University (2020). He was a Fulbright visiting researcher in Rosemont College in Philadelphia (2004/2005), visiting researcher at Netherlands Institute for Advanced Study (2012) and at the Remarque Institute (2018). Among other topics his research dealt with limitations of modernization processes and post-socialist nostalgia in (former) Yugoslavia. He participated in second Korčula after Party in 2019, and event inspired by the Praxis School. He was one of contributing authors to the Slovenian book about Alan Ford. His book on political graffiti was presented at the Museum of Yugoslavia via online discussion supposed by the Embassy of Slovenia in Serbia and the Ministry of Culture of Slovenia.

References 

People from the Municipality of Šempeter-Vrtojba
Academic staff of the University of Ljubljana
Columbia University fellows
Academic staff of the University of Rijeka
Academic staff of Jagiellonian University
Yale University fellows
1965 births
Living people